The Vickers Warwick was a multi-purpose twin-engined British aircraft developed and operated during the Second World War. In line with the naming convention followed by other RAF heavy bombers of the era, it was named after a British city or town, in this case Warwick. The Warwick was the largest British twin-engined aircraft to see use during the Second World War.

The Warwick was designed and manufactured by Vickers-Armstrongs during the late 1930s. It was intended to serve as a larger counterpart to the Vickers Wellington bomber. The two aircraft share similar construction and design principles but unlike the smaller Wellington bomber, development of the Warwick was delayed by a lack of suitable high-powered engines. The maiden flight occurred on 13 August 1939 but delays to its intended powerplant, the Napier Sabre engine, led to alternatives being explored in the form of the Bristol Centaurus and Pratt & Whitney R-2800 Double Wasp radial engines. By the time adequate engines were available, rapid advances in the field of aviation had undermined the potency of the design in the face of Luftwaffe fighters.

The Warwick entered quantity production during 1942 and squadron service with the Royal Air Force (RAF). Shortly thereafter, it had been superseded as a bomber and barely a dozen aircraft were built as bombers. The type was used by the RAF in RAF Transport Command and by RAF Coastal Command as an air-sea rescue and maritime reconnaissance aircraft. The Warwick was also adopted by the Polish Air Forces in exile in Great Britain and the South African Air Force. A civil operator, the British Overseas Airways Corporation (BOAC), also operated a handful of Warwicks.

Design and development

Origins

In October 1932, the British industrial conglomerate Vickers-Armstrongs decided to tender for the Air Ministry Specification B.9/32, which called for the development of a twin-engined medium bomber. During late 1934, by which point the company was already in the midst of developing their Type 271 design, to meet the needs of Specification B.9/32, Vickers received a draft requirement for a larger bomber. The draft specification developed into Air Ministry Specification B.1/35, which sought a twin-engined heavy (by the standards of the day) strategic bomber. The aircraft was intended to make use of more powerful engines, in the range of 1,000 hp, that were being developed, to enable the bomber to be faster and carry a heavier bomb load than the earlier B.3/34 specification. Among the requirements of Specification B.1/35 was a speed of no less than 195 mph while flying at 15,000 feet, a range of 1,500 miles while carrying 2,000 lb of bombs, along with a limitation on the wingspan to less than 100 feet, while the engines were also to be furnished with variable-pitch propellers.

The Warwick was designed in parallel with the smaller Wellington, both aircraft having been derived from the Vickers Type 271 design, developed for Specification B.9/32. By the end of July 1935, the Air Ministry was able to consider eight designs; the design proposed by Vickers, the 284, powered by a pair of Bristol Hercules engines, had generously exceeded the specification. On 7 October 1935, Vickers received an order for a prototype, the Air Ministry also ordering prototypes of the designs tendered by Armstrong Whitworth (known as the AW.39, a development of the Armstrong Whitworth Whitley) and Handley Page (known as HP.55). Before these alternative designs were built, they were cancelled, Handley Page and Armstrong Whitworth preferring to work upon the newer specifications released for medium (P.13/36) and heavy (B.12/36) bombers.

Changes and redesigns
As Specification B.1/35 was considered to be a heavier complement to Specification B.9/32, it was initially thought that there would be no need to produce a mock-up of the type. On 14 March 1936, in light of major design changes being submitted, the production of a complete mock-up was authorised. Around the same time, it was decided to allocate the Vickers 284 type number to the project, while the redesigned B.9/32 (which would become the Wellington) became the Vickers 285. As a consequence of the relaxation of the restrictions imposed by the 1932 Geneva Disarmament Conference, the weight of the Vickers 284 and 285 expanded gradually, until the 285 approached the original specified weight for Specification B.1/35.

During 1936, Specification B.1/34 was modified to require the aircraft to have a greater fuel and bombload capacity. During January 1937, the Rolls-Royce Vulture liquid-cooled X engine was named as the alternative powerplant of the Vickers 284 and it was adopted in late 1938. The Vulture, which had been intended for the rival Avro Manchester bomber, was subsequently determined to be unlikely to be available in sufficient numbers for the Warwick, as well as being unreliable and on 2 July 1937, an order for a second prototype was placed the Air Ministry as insurance against the failure of the Vulture.

The second prototype (L9704) was originally designed for the Napier Sabre engine but development of the Sabre was slow, partially as a consequence of production capacity being urgently required to keep up with manufacture of the Hawker Typhoon fighter. L9704 was instead fitted with the Bristol Centaurus radial engine. Other aspects of the design proved troublesome, such as the gun turrets and official doubts over the geodetic airframe structure proposed for the type, the latter having been a pioneering design element from British aircraft designer Barnes Wallis.

In February 1939, it was decided not to proceed with development beyond the pair of prototypes because of difficulties with the Vulture engine but this was reversed the following January. In late June 1939, following the completion of a high-level review and resubmission of programme data, work resumed. While Vickers chose to continue with the project, official doubts, over slow progress caused by work on the Wellington and the lack of suitable engines, led to a growing official expectation that the design would be surpassed by later aircraft.

Into flight
On 13 August 1939, the first prototype (serial K8178), powered by the Vulture engines, made its maiden flight from Brooklands. This initial flight, by test pilot Joseph "Mutt" Summers, only lasted for a few minutes due to a defect in the carburettor linkage. The smaller Wellington bomber had made its maiden flight three years earlier and quantity production of the type had started 18 months prior. When fully equipped, the calculated all-up service weight of the first prototype was 42,182 lb, almost double that of the weight originally given by Vickers in its initial tender for the design. Initial flight tests with the prototype revealed the type to be slow, underpowered and unable to maintain altitude on one engine.

Fitted with the Centaurus engine, the second prototype performed its first flight on 5 April 1940. The second prototype had incorporated various improvements to its design, such as a re-designed elevator, to improve its handling. There was a definitive improvement in performance; according to aviation author Norman Barfield, the second prototype was claimed to be faster than the Hawker Hurricane, a contemporary British fighter aircraft, at certain altitudes. While the Centaurus-powered prototype was viewed as more promising, the development of the Centaurus engine was at an early stage and was again in relatively short supply. In October 1939, it was proposed that the type could be redesigned as a four-engined aircraft, powered by either Rolls-Royce Merlin XX or Bristol Hercules HE7SM engines; after some study, the use of four engines was discarded after it was found to seriously reduce range and payload.

Another proposal made was the use of the American Pratt & Whitney Double Wasp radial engine. Performance projections showed similar performance to the Hercules III-powered Wellington bomber but with a significantly greater payload; the engines were also available due to the cancellation of contracts previously placed by the French government. To explore this option, the second prototype was converted to use the R-2800-S14A4-G engines and first flew in this form in July 1941. The Double Wasp installation was considered to be inferior to the Centaurus engine but the aircraft was eventually ordered with the Pratt & Whitney engine.

On 3 January 1941, an initial production order was placed for 250 Warwicks, consisting of 150 Double Wasp-powered Mk I aircraft and 100 Centaurus-powered Mk IIs; deliveries were scheduled to commence in November that year. It was at this point that the proposed aircraft received its name; in accordance with the Air Ministry's practice of naming bombers after British towns and cities and with Vickers using 'W' as the initial letter (to indicate the designs of Barnes Wallis), Warwick was selected at the type's official name.

Production
The large initial production contract gave the programme a relative sense of security but there was still the need to resolve troubles with the Centaurus engine. The Double Wasp engine, with a three-bladed 15-ft diameter Hamilton Standard propeller, became the usual engine. Due to the time it took for the Double Wasps to reach Vickers in Britain from Pratt & Whitney in the U.S., some delays were unavoidable. During 1941, the second prototype was engaged in flight trials to support the manufacturing effort, such as the flight testing of an alternative tail, which was determined to have improved the Warwick's handling. The prototype was refitted with production standard engines and propellers; this revealed problems with engine ignition, which were resolved with a revised booster coil. The Warwick was subject to a high level of investigation with the aim of keeping the type relevant to the rapidly changing circumstances of the conflict; it was out of this process that a relatively orderly progression towards standardised production was soon made.

Due to persistent engine shortages and changes in policy, only 16 of the planned 150 Warwick bombers were completed. Even as the first bomber aircraft was being completed at Weybridge, the type's capabilities were already below the Air Staff requirements for bomber aircraft, which was mainly a result of rapid advances in the field rather than faults of the design. Bombers were being required to carry ever-greater bombloads over greater distances; by this point, a decision had been already made to re-equip RAF Bomber Command exclusively with a new generation of four-engine bombers. Just as the earlier Wellington was displaced from bombing missions to other roles, the new Warwick was directed to other activities, including air-sea rescue, troop and cargo transport, long range anti-submarine patrols, general reconnaissance and operational crew training.

By January 1943, a total of 57 Warwick Mk I aircraft had been completed; that month, it was decided that the Warwick would be the standard transport and air-sea rescue aircraft. During mid-1943, a Warwick Mk I was converted to become the Warwick Mk II prototype; the principal difference was the fitting of Centaurus IV engines. A total of 219 Warwick Mk I aircraft were constructed, the last 95 of these with  R-2800-47 engines.

During 1942, an order for 14 Warwick transports, Warwick C.Mk.I and Vickers 456, was made for the British Overseas Airways Corporation (BOAC), a civil operator. The prescribed operational requirements were the carriage of mail, freight and passengers (in order of priority) between Bathurst in South Africa and Cairo in Egypt, complementing BOAC's flying boat operations between England and Bathurst. The order was quickly met by converting existing B.Mk.I Warwicks, by removing the military equipment, fairing over gun turrets, along with the installation of cabin windows, a freight floor, long-range fuel tanks and exhaust stack flame dampers (for night flights).

The Warwick used Barnes Wallis' geodetic airframe construction pioneered in the Wellesley and Wellington. In this system, a network of intersecting structural members made from duralumin were covered by wired-on fabric. The load was distributed amongst the structure, providing great redundancy in the event of damage, at the expense of complexity of construction.

Operational history

The first production Warwick B Mk I was delivered to the RAF for testing at the Aeroplane and Armament Experimental Establishment, Boscombe Down on 3 July 1942. On 28 January 1942, this first aircraft was lost, reportedly due to fabric panels on the wings having come loose. The second production Warwick promptly took its place in flying trials; on 18 February 1943, it too was destroyed, by a fire which began in the starboard engine.

Only 16 aircraft were delivered as bombers, as by this time more capable four-engined heavy bombers such as the Short Stirling and Handley Page Halifax were in service. Those Warwicks that were delivered in the bomber configuration saw little use as such, instead being used to investigate various kinds of equipment and technical matters, including navigational equipment, engine performance, role suitability, and air-dropped lifeboats. It soon became clear that the Warwick, with its spacious fuselage and long range, would be well suited to utility roles. In January 1943, the Air Staff decided that the Warwick would serve as the predominant aircraft for transport and air-sea rescue.

Early testing showed the Warwick to be under-powered and with severe handling problems, especially when flown on one engine. Stability and control trials commenced with the third production Warwick, which yielded acceptable handling during single engine operations when fitted with a new bulged rudder. The version of Double Wasp fitted to early models proved extremely unreliable with many failures; later versions fitted with the Centaurus engine had better performance but the handling problems were never solved.

The Warwick was subsequently considered for transport and air-sea rescue and BV243 was converted into a transport to serve as a trial aircraft. An additional 13 Mk Is were converted on the production line as C Mk I transports for use by BOAC. BOAC's Warwicks were used briefly on its Middle East services before being transferred back to RAF Transport Command in 1944. One hundred similar aircraft were built for the RAF as Warwick C Mk IIIs, and entered service with 525 Squadron in June 1944, with three more squadrons operating the Warwick III. They were mainly used in the Mediterranean theatre, as the vulnerability of the fabric skinning to high temperature and humidity stopped plans to operate the Warwick in the Far East, the model remaining in use until retired in 1946.

The remainder of the first batch of 250 Warwicks were used by RAF Coastal Command for anti-submarine reconnaissance. From 1943, Warwicks were loaded with the  Mk IA airborne lifeboat and used for air-sea rescue. Warwicks were credited with rescuing crews from Halifaxes, Lancasters, Wellingtons and B-17 Flying Fortress, and during Operation Market Garden, from Hamilcar gliders, all of which ditched in the English Channel or North Sea.

A production order for 525 Warwick Mk V was placed although only 235 were completed, most of which went directly into storage in 1944. In early 1945, this stored variant was issued to 179 Squadron, stationed at RAF St Eval. Four Warwick GR MkVs crashed on test flights from Brooklands during the first half of 1945. The first of these was PN773 which suffered an engine failure on take-off on 2 January and was skilfully force-landed by test pilot Bob Handasyde close to St Mary's Church in Byfleet; pilot and flight test observer Bob Rampling escaped unhurt; this aeroplane was later repaired and flown again and a propeller blade from the 1945 accident survives today in the Brooklands Museum collection. The Warwick Mk V was also operated by 17 and 27 Squadrons of the South African Air Force.

Variants

Warwick Mark I
 Warwick B Mk I –; original production bomber, of 150 ordered, only 16 aircraft were built. They were used for a variety of tests.
 Warwick C Mk I or Vickers Type 456 –; transport version for BOAC, for use on its Mediterranean and North African routes. 14 built.
 Warwick B/ASR Mk I –; 40 aircraft converted from the Warwick B Mk I bomber. The Warwick ASRs were used as air-sea rescue aircraft. They could carry two sets of Lindholme lifesaving equipment.
 Warwick ASR (Stage A) –; 10 aircraft converted from the Warwick B Mk I bomber. The Warwick ASR (Stage A) was used for air-sea rescue. They could carry one airborne lifeboat and two sets of Lindholme lifesaving equipment.
 Warwick ASR (Stage B) –; 20 aircraft converted from the Warwick B Mk I bomber. The Warwick ASR (Stage B) were air-sea rescue aircraft, carrying the same equipment as the Warwick ASRs and ASR (Stage As).
 Warwick ASR Mk I or Vickers Type 462 was an air-sea rescue version, it could carry an airborne lifeboat. The aircraft was powered by two 1,850 hp (1380 kW) Pratt & Whitney Double Wasp R-2800-S1A4G radial piston engines; 205 built.

Warwick Mark II
 Warwick B Mk II or Vickers Type 413 –; bomber prototype, only one example was ever built, converted from a Warwick B Mk I.
 Warwick GR Mk II or Vickers Type 469 –; anti-submarine, general reconnaissance version. It was equipped to carry torpedoes and bombs.  It was powered two 2,500 hp (1,864 kW) Bristol Centaurus VI radial piston engines; 118 built.
 Warwick GR Mk II Met –; meteorological reconnaissance version of the Warwick GR Mk II; 14 built.

Warwick Mark III
 Warwick C Mk III or Vickers Type 460 –; transport version. It had a pannier-like extension below the central fuselage, the normal loaded weight being raised to 45,000 lb (20,400 kg). It could carry 24 equipped troops or eight to 10 passengers in the VIP version. No armament was carried; 100 built.

Warwick Mark V
 Warwick GR Mk V or Vickers Type 474 –; anti-submarine, general reconnaissance aircraft. It was powered by two Bristol Centaurus VII radial piston engines, armed with 7 machine guns and could carry  of bombs, mines or depth charges. A Leigh light was fitted ventrally. The first operational sortie was carried out by 179 Squadron on 4 December 1944; 210 built.

Warwick Mark VI
 Warwick ASR Mk VI or Vickers Type 485 –; final air-sea rescue version. The aircraft was powered by two Pratt & Whitney R-2800-2SBG Double Wasp radial piston engines; 94 built.

Operators

Military operators

 Polish Air Forces in exile in Great Britain
 No. 301 Polish Bomber Squadron
 No. 304 Polish Bomber Squadron

 South African Air Force
 17 Squadron SAAF
 27 Squadron SAAF

 Royal Air Force
 No. 38 Squadron RAF
 No. 167 Squadron RAF
 No. 179 Squadron RAF
 No. 251 Squadron RAF
 No. 269 Squadron RAF
 No. 276 Squadron RAF
 No. 277 Squadron RAF
 No. 278 Squadron RAF
 No. 279 Squadron RAF
 No. 280 Squadron RAF
 No. 281 Squadron RAF
 No. 282 Squadron RAF
 No. 283 Squadron RAF
 No. 284 Squadron RAF
 No. 292 Squadron RAF
 No. 293 Squadron RAF
 No. 294 Squadron RAF
 No. 353 Squadron RAF
 No. 520 Squadron RAF
 No. 525 Squadron RAF
 No. 621 Squadron RAF

Civil operators

 BOAC

Specifications (Warwick ASR Mk I)

See also

References

Citiations

Bibliography

 "Airborne Lifeboats:Fully Provisioned Power Lifeboat Dropped to Ditched Air Crews". Flight, 18 January 1945, pp. 62–64.
 Andrews, C.F and E.B. Morgan. Vickers Aircraft since 1908. London: Putnam, 1988. .
 Barfield, Norman. "Vickers-Armstrongs Warwick variants". Aircraft in Profile, Volume 11. Windsor, Berkshire, UK: Profile Publications Ltd., 1972.
 Bartelski, Jan. Disasters In The Air. London: Airlife, 2001. .
 Buttler, Tony. British Secret Projects: Fighters & Bombers 1935-1950. Hinckley: Midland Publishing, 2004. 
 "Dropping an Airborne Lifeboat". Flight, 8 March 1945, p. 253.
 Green, William and Gordon Scarborough. WW2 Fact Files: RAF Bombers, Part 2. London: Jane's Publishing Company Ltd., 1981. .
 Halley, James J. The Squadrons of the Royal Air Force. Tonbridge, Kent, UK: Air-Britain (Historians) Ltd, 1980. .
 Jones, Barry. "Database:Vickers Warwick". Aeroplane,  Vol. 38, No. 6, Issue No 446, June 2010. London: IPC. . pp. 63–78.
 March, Daniel J. (editor). British Warplanes of World War II. London: Aerospace, 1998. .
 Mason, Francis K. The British Bomber since 1914. London: Putnam, 1994. .
 Taylor, John W.R. "Vickers Warwick". Combat Aircraft of the World from 1909 to the Present. New York: G.P. Putnam's Sons, 1969. .
 "Vickers 284 Warwick." Control Column, Official Organ of the British Aircraft Preservation Council, Volume 11, No. 2, February/March 1977.
 "Vickers Warwick: The Good-Samaritan Bomber" Part One. Air International, Vol. 34 No. 3, March 1988. pp. 134–140. .
 "Vickers Warwick: The Good-Samaritan Bomber" Part Two. Air International, Vol. 34 No. 4, April 1988. pp. 202–208. .

External links

 Manual: (1945) A.P. 2068 C&E-P.N. - Pilot's Notes For Warwick II & V. Two Centaurus VII or XI Engines
 Uboat.net entry

1930s British anti-submarine aircraft
1930s British military transport aircraft
1930s British patrol aircraft
Warwick
Aircraft first flown in 1939
Twin piston-engined tractor aircraft
Barnes Wallis